Tayloria is a genus of mosses in the family Splachnaceae. It comprises 45 species, divided among 6 subgenera:

Tayloria subg. Tayloria
Tayloria acuminata Homsch.
Tayloria delavayi (Besch.) Besch.
Tayloria froelichiana (Hedw.) Broth.
Tayloria grandis (Long) Goffinet & Shaw
Tayloria kilimandscharica Broth.
Tayloria rudimenta Bai & Tan
Tayloria rudolphiana (Garov.) B.S.G.
Tayloria serrata (Hedw.) B.S.G.
Tayloria splachnoides (Schwagr.) W.J. Hook.
Tayloria tenuis (With.) W.P. Schimp.
Tayloria subg. Pseudotetraplodon A.K. Kop.
Tayloria altorum Herzog
Tayloria dubyi Broth.
Tayloria novo-guinensis E.B. Bart.
Tayloria octoblepharum (W.J. Hook.) Mitt.
Tayloria scabriseta (W.J. Hook.) Mitt.
Tayloria stenophysata (Herz.) A. Kop.
Tayloria tasmanica Broth.
Tayloria subg. Eremodon (Wils.) Broth.
Tayloria callophylla (C. Müll.) Mitt.
Tayloria gunnii (Wils.) J.H. Willis
Tayloria magellanica (Brid.) Mitt.
Tayloria mirabilis (Card.) Broth.
Tayloria purpurascens (W.J. Hook. & Wils.) Broth.
Tayloria subg. Cyrtodon (R. Br.) Lindb.
Tayloria alpicola Broth.
Tayloria hornschuchii (Grev. & Am.) Broth.
Tayloria jacquemontii (B.S.G.) Mitt.
Tayloria lingulata (Dick.) Lind.
Tayloria nepalensis Iwat & Steere
Tayloria pseudoalpicola Iwat. & Steere
Tayloria subg. Brachymitrion (Tayl.) Broth.
Tayloria cochabambae MOll. Hall.
Tayloria immersa (Goffinet) Goffinet, Shaw & Cox
Tayloria jamesonii (Tayl.) Müll. Hall.
Tayloria laciniata Spruce
Tayloria moritziana Müll. Hall.
Tayloria pocsii A. K. Kop.
Tayloria subg. Orthodon (R. Br.) Broth.
Tayloria arenaria (C. Müll) Broth.
Tayloria borneensis Dix.
Tayloria chiapensis H. Crum
Tayloria indica Mitt.
Tayloria isleana (Besch.) Broth.
Tayloria longiseta E. B. Bart.
Tayloria orthodonta (P. de Beauv.) Wijk & Marg.
Tayloria sandwicensis (C. Müll) Broth.
Tayloria solitaria (Card.) T. Kop. & W.A. Weber
Tayloria squarrosa (W.J. Hook.) T. Kop.
Tayloria subglabra (Griffith) Mitt.

References

External links

Moss genera
Splachnales